Ron Link may refer to:

 Ron Link (director), American off-Broadway director
 Ron Link (entertainer), Dutch talent show singer
 Ron Link (patient advocate), founder of Surgical Eyes